The Ketelmeer is the tongue of the IJsselmeer into which the River IJssel drains, it is situated between the polders Noordoostpolder (North-east Polder) and Oostelijk Flevoland (East Flevoland), and connects the river IJssel to the IJsselmeer. It is one of the bordering lakes, a continuous body of water which separate Flevoland from the Noordostpolder and the ancient lands of the provinces of Gelderland and Utrecht.
The Ketelmeer covers an area of 3500 hectares, most of which is in the province of Flevoland, but the river delta of the IJssel is in province of Overijssel.

It was carved out from the Zuiderzee by the construction of the polders of Noordoostpolder and Flevoland, between which it lies. It is via Ketelmeer that the IJsselmeer connects to the Zwarte Meer and the Veluwemeer, the strip of water which separates Flevoland from the coast of the mainland.

The Ketelmeer contains the IJsseloog, a kilometre-diameter circular pit in an artificial island, built to contain the toxic sludge dredged from the bed of the Ketelmeer

The Ketelbrug is a bascule bridge over the Ketelmeer connecting the Noordoostpolder and Oostelijk Flevoland.

References

Lakes of the Netherlands
Landforms of Flevoland
Landforms of Overijssel
Dronten
Kampen, Overijssel
Noordoostpolder
Ramsar sites in the Netherlands